Pinconning Area School District (PASD) is a school district headquartered in Pinconning, Michigan.

Schools
Secondary:
 Pinconning High School
 Pinconning Middle School

Primary:
 Linwood Elementary School
 Pinconning Central Elementary School

Preschool:
 Pinconning Advancement Academy - Houses Pinconning GSRP (Great Start Readiness Program).

The district previously operated Mount Forest Elementary School, which closed in 2009 and remained unused as of 2015.

Sports
The Pinconning Spartans high school softball team won state championships in 1989, 1993, and 2000. The volleyball team won a state championship in 1992. The Pinconning Boys Varsity Bowling Team won the State Championship in 2008.

References

External links
 Pinconning Area School District
School districts in Michigan
Education in Bay County, Michigan